Camp Esquagama, formerly the St. Louis County 4-H Club Camp, is a summer camp in Biwabik Township, Minnesota, United States.  It was established on the east shore of Esquagama Lake in 1934 with the first place prize money from a contest to name the best county 4-H program in the nation.  The logs were donated by the Oliver Iron Mining Company and labor furnished by local Civilian Conservation Corps and Works Progress Administration companies.  The camp was listed on the National Register of Historic Places in 1985 for its local significance in the themes of architecture, entertainment/recreation, and social history.  It was nominated for its exemplary log construction and unique origin.

See also
 National Register of Historic Places listings in St. Louis County, Minnesota

References

External links
 Camp Esquagama

Buildings and structures completed in 1934
Buildings and structures in St. Louis County, Minnesota
Civilian Conservation Corps in Minnesota
Log buildings and structures on the National Register of Historic Places in Minnesota
National Register of Historic Places in St. Louis County, Minnesota
Rustic architecture in Minnesota
Esquagama
Temporary populated places on the National Register of Historic Places
Tourist attractions in St. Louis County, Minnesota
Works Progress Administration in Minnesota